The Lamtuna are a nomadic Berber tribe belonging to the Iẓnagen / Sanhaja (Zenaga) confederation, who traditionally inhabited areas from Sous to Adrar Plateau. During the Almoravid period, many Lamtunas emigrated northwards. Currently, the Lemtuna Tribe is based in the South of Mauritania (Monguel and Agueilat). The chief of this Tribe is Mr. Limam Ould Teguedi (former Minister of Justice, former Minister of Culture and former Attorney General of Mauritania. Among notable families, the family of Ehl Aly Ibn Ibrahim and the family of Ehel Sidelemine, Ehl Abdawa, Ehl Mohamed El-Emine, Ehl Mohammed Ghali. Sahrawi Tajakant as well as Messouma tribes are of the most recognisable offshoots of the Lamtunas. They inhabit the area between Morocco and Western Sahara.

The Banu Ghaniya, the successors of this dynasty in Tripoli and the Nafusa Mountains and the governors of the Spanish Balearic Islands until about the middle of the 13th century, originated from this tribe as well.

Notable Lamtunas
Abu Bakr ibn Umar
Yusuf ibn Tashfin
Yahya ibn Umar al-Lamtuni

 
Berber peoples and tribes
Sanhaja